Dulanjana Mendis (born 20 May 1990) is a Sri Lankan cricketer. He made his first-class debut for Sri Lanka Navy Sports Club in the 2009–10 Premier Trophy on 2 October 2009.

References

External links
 

1990 births
Living people
Sri Lankan cricketers
Lankan Cricket Club cricketers
Sri Lanka Navy Sports Club cricketers
Tamil Union Cricket and Athletic Club cricketers
Cricketers from Colombo